Forrestfield United Soccer Club is one of the biggest football clubs in Perth, Western Australia.  The club was founded in 1962 as Cottesloe Soccer Club. It is a regional community club in the City of Kalamunda situated at Hartfield Park in the foothills of the picturesque Darling Ranges, with over 600 players and close to 800 members.
The club offers a development pathway with Football Federation Australia accredited coaches via its Junior NPL program all the way through to its semi-professional senior team. Forrestfield United is known to have some of the best Junior NPL squads in the state and is an NPL club to keep your eyes on for the future.

History
The club was originally known as Cottesloe SC when it was first admitted into the State League competition in 1962.

Cottesloe SC then merged with the Swan Migrant Association (SMA) in 1971 to become SMA Cottesloe SC. As SMA were based in the Ascot area, the club's name was changed to Ascot Soccer Club the following year.

Ascot were WA Champions in 1974, taking out the State Premier Division title by nine points.

1978 was a pivotal year for the club. They won the last Ampol Cup competition, the trophy for which is still on display in the team's Club House. Merger discussions occurred at the end of the season with then fourth division club, Kalamunda United SC, who were based at Hartfield Park, Forrestfield. The merger went ahead, and the combined team entered the State Competition in 1979 as Forrestfield United SC.

The Senior team competed in the Amateur League from 1993 to 2004.

In 2017 the club embarked on a $1.5 million improvement, which saw a state of the art 500 seat boutique stadium built, a pitch perimeter fence installed, full refurbishment of the changing room facilities and the floodlighting upgraded to Football West requirements. All this with the help of the Shire of Kalamunda, State and Federal Government.

In recent years the club has returned to the highest level of football in WA and competed in the NPL in the 2018 season.

 they finished 1st in WA State League Division 2 and secured promotion to WA State League Division 1.

 in their first season returning to WA State League Division 1 they finished 3rd.

 they finished 2nd in WA State League Division 1 and secured promotion to the NPL via a 2 leg play-off against Mandurah City 6–3.

 they finished 13th in the NPL and were relegated to WA State League Division 1.

Honours
State League Premiers – 1974 (as Ascot)
Top Four/Five Cup Winners – 1981
First Division Winners – 1984
State Division 2 Winners – 2015

Current squad

Staff
President: Mark Twamley 
First-team coach: Richie Abrams
Assistant coach: Malcom Tshuma
Strength and conditioning: Conor Rae
Goalkeeper coach: Steven Parry
Team Managers: Pablo & Georgina Vicencio
Physiotherapist: Lin Weibin (Wayne)

Football Operations: Paul Mansfield
Reserves Coach: Paul Vellerius
Youth 18's Coach: Daryl Platten
Club Photographer: Catherine Bryant
Club Graphic Designer: Jesse Bryant
Club Reporter/Media: Alfie Bryant

References

External links
 Official club website
 - Club Twitter
  - Club Facebook

Soccer clubs in Perth, Western Australia
Association football clubs established in 1962
1962 establishments in Australia